James Alexander McDonald (7 March 1877 – 7 March 1968) was an Australian rules footballer who played with Essendon in the Victorian Football League (VFL).

Notes

External links 

1877 births
1968 deaths
Australian rules footballers from Melbourne
Essendon Football Club players
People from Wyndham Vale, Victoria